Gary J. Sheffield (August 18, 1936 – November 20, 2004) was an American bobsledder who competed from the early 1950s to the early 1960s. He won four medals at the FIBT World Championships with one gold (Four-man: 1959) and three silvers (Two-man: 1961, Four-man: 1951, 1961). In 2004, he died at the age of 68.

References

Bobsleigh four-man world championship medalists since 1930
Sheffield in action during the four-man event at the 1961 FIBT World Championships in Lake Placid, NY.

American male bobsledders
1936 births
2004 deaths